Eugenia Belova is a Russian orienteering competitor, and two times junior world champion in relay.

Junior career
She won a gold medal in the relay at the 1999 Junior World Orienteering Championships in Varna, together with Tatiana Kostyleva and Tatiana Pereliaeva. She also received a gold medal in the relay also in 2000, together with Yulia Sedina and Tatiana Pereliaeva.

References

Year of birth missing (living people)
Living people
Russian orienteers
Female orienteers
Foot orienteers
21st-century Russian women
Junior World Orienteering Championships medalists